Blaston is a village and civil parish in the Harborough district of Leicestershire.  It is a small parish with a population of 54 according to the 2001 census. As the population had remained less than 100 details from the 2011 census are included in the civil parish of Horninghold. The village is near Nevill Holt, Medbourne and Hallaton. St Giles' Church, Blaston was rebuilt in 1878. Blaston was first mentioned in Domesday Book and the name probably means the settlement of Bleath (an Anglo-Saxon).

Annual Show 

There is an annual show on the last Sunday in June, organised by the Blaston and District Agricultural Society. In 2011, the show took place on Sunday 26 June, close to the nearby village of Slawston. The Show raises money for local charities.

References

External links

Victoria County History on Blaston
the Society

Villages in Leicestershire
Civil parishes in Harborough District